Richard Scott Perkin (1906 – 1969) was an American entrepreneur.

At an early age he developed an interest in astronomy, and began making telescopes and grinding lenses and mirrors. He only spent a year in college studying chemical engineering before he began working at a brokerage firm on Wall Street.

During the 1930s he met Charles Elmer when the latter was presenting a lecture. The two had a mutual interest in astronomy and decided to go into business together. In 1937, they founded Perkin-Elmer as an optical design and consulting company. Richard served as president of the company until 1960, then became chairman of the board.

The crater Perkin on the Moon was named after him, while Elmer was named after his business partner.

Perkin was married to Gladys Frelinghuysen Talmage  who became CEO after he died. A decade later, Gladys commissioned a commemorative history to be written. One hundred copies were printed and distributed to friends.

Further reading
 Fahy, Thomas P., Richard Scott Perkin and the Perkin-Elmer Corporation, 1987, Perkin-Elmer Print Shop, .

See also
List of astronomical instrument makers

References

External links
 

1906 births
1969 deaths
Telescope manufacturers
20th-century American businesspeople